This is the full list of accolades received by Gully Boy. In the 65th Filmfare Awards the film won 13 awards at the show, the most awards for a single film in a year, has broken the record of Black, which won 11 awards in 2006.
The film was also India's official entry to 92nd Academy Awards for the Best International feature film category though it was not nominated.

Indian awards

International awards

Notes

References

Lists of accolades by Indian film